Nelly Moenne Loccoz (born 9 April 1990 in Annecy) is a snowboarder from France. She competed for France at the 2010 Winter Olympics in snowboard cross, finishing sixth.

References

External links
 
 
 
 
 

1990 births
Living people
French female snowboarders
Olympic snowboarders of France
Snowboarders at the 2010 Winter Olympics
Snowboarders at the 2014 Winter Olympics
Snowboarders at the 2018 Winter Olympics
Université Savoie-Mont Blanc alumni
X Games athletes
Sportspeople from Annecy
Competitors at the 2015 Winter Universiade
21st-century French women